Pjetër Zakaria (13??–1414) was an Albanian prelate of the Roman Catholic Church.

Pjetër Zakaria was born in the mid 14th century in northern Albania. He came from the noble Albanian family of Zaharia. Most historians attribute the establishment of relations between Pope Boniface IX and the Zakaria family to him. In 1390 Zakaria became bishop of the Roman Catholic Diocese of Sapë and Dagnum.

Sources

Pjeter
1414 deaths
14th-century Albanian Roman Catholic bishops
Year of birth unknown